Fireman's Drinking Fountain is a historic drinking fountain located at Slatington, Lehigh County, Pennsylvania.  It was built in 1909, and is a 12-foot high monument, with a 7-foot, 3-inch, statue of a volunteer fireman holding a child in his left hand and a lantern in his right. The zinc statue was manufactured by the J. W. Fiske & Company.  It was restored in 1979, after being hit by an automobile.

It was added to the National Register of Historic Places in 1981.

Gallery

See also
Drinking fountains in the United States
 List of firefighting monuments and memorials

References

Firefighting memorials
Monuments and memorials on the National Register of Historic Places in Pennsylvania
National Register of Historic Places in Lehigh County, Pennsylvania
Buildings and structures completed in 1909
Buildings and structures in Lehigh County, Pennsylvania
Zinc sculptures in the United States
1909 sculptures
Fountains in Pennsylvania
Monuments and memorials in Pennsylvania
Drinking fountains in the United States
Firefighting in Pennsylvania
1909 establishments in Pennsylvania